D.M.Z. is the fifth full-length album by American Christian rock band Resurrection Band, released in 1982. It was the band's final release for Light Records.

Recording history 

The album begins with one of Resurrection Band's most popular songs, "Military Man",. D.M.Z. is a split personality, featuring either hard rock akin to Van Halen, or new wave-influenced mid-tempo numbers. However, long-time Resurrection Band fans consider Stu Heiss' opening 90-second feedback-drenched guitar solo to "White Noise" as one of the best moments in the band's history, and this song proved to be just as popular live.

Lyrically, the album focuses on individual stories of emotional disconnection and spiritual confusion, offering the Savior as the answer to both.  For the first time, the band directly addresses the concerns of high-school age listeners in "Area 312" and "The Prisoner", a trend that would continue on future releases. Big social issues addressed on the album focus this time around on war and its destructive effects as well as the un-Christian nature of the military itself, repeated several times in "Military Man", "Babylon" and "White Noise"—hence, the inspiration for the album title.

This album was re-released on CD in 2004 by Retroactive Records.

Track listing 

All songs written by Glenn Kaiser unless otherwise noted
 "Military Man" (G. Kaiser, Jon Trott, Stu Heiss, Jim Denton) – 3:38
 "Reluctance" – 2:11
 "Babylon" (G. Kaiser, Trott) – 2:33
 "I Need Your Love" – 3:22
 "Area 312" (Trott, Wendi Kaiser, Heiss, Denton) – 3:54
 "No Alibi" – 4:39
 "White Noise" - (Trott, Roy Montroy) – 3:41
 "Lonely Hearts" – 3:00
 "The Prisoner" – 2:54
 "So in Love with You" (G. Kaiser, Trott) – 3:38

Personnel

 Glenn Kaiser – vocals, guitars
 Wendi Kaiser – vocals
 Stu Heiss – guitars, keyboards
 Jim Denton – fretless bass, synthesizer, background vocals
 John Herrin – drums
 Steve Eisen – saxophone
 Resurrection Band – producer
 Roger Heiss – engineer
 Steve Hall – mastering
 MCA Whitney – mastering location
 Dick Randall – album cover concept and art
 Pat Peterson – photography
 Denise Omernick – photography
 Linda Dillon – photography
 JPUSA Graphics – other art and layout
Per album liner notes:

References 

Resurrection Band albums
1982 albums